Diane "Dee" Mosbacher (born January 13, 1949 in Houston, Texas) is an American filmmaker, lesbian feminist activist, and practicing psychiatrist. In 1993, she founded Woman Vision, a nonprofit organization.

Early life and education 
Mosbacher is the daughter of the late Jane Pennybacker Mosbacher and Robert Mosbacher (1927–2010), who served as U.S. Secretary of Commerce under George H. W. Bush from 1989 to 1992. She has two sisters and a brother.

Mosbacher and her father had a close relationship despite the Republican Party's largely anti-gay position. In 1992, on a day when the two were both giving commencement speeches, she told a reporter for The Washington Post that she began her speech: "Dad and I had breakfast this morning. We looked at each other's speeches. He would have used mine but he's not a lesbian. I would have used his, but I'm not a Republican." Mosbacher spoke out against the gay-bashing and anti-woman focus of the Republican Party's 1992 campaign.

Mosbacher earned a bachelor's degree in psychology from Pitzer College in Claremont, California, a doctorate in social psychology from Union Graduate School, and a medical degree from Baylor College of Medicine.

Career 
Mosbacher was a medical intern at Cambridge Hospital through Harvard Medical School from 1983–1984 and was a psychiatry resident in the same hospital from 1984–1987.

She became a women's health activist in college and began directing documentary films as a student at Baylor College and as a resident at Harvard Medical School. Her films focused on discrimination against lesbian and gay physicians and patients, and she wrote many articles about gay and lesbian patients for the academic and medical community.

Woman Vision 
In 1992, Dee Mosbacher founded the non-profit production company Woman Vision to counteract the media campaign on LGBT issues conducted by the Republican Party, which was the focus of the 1992 Republican National Convention.

As of 2009, Mosbacher has directed or produced nine documentary films through Woman Vision, each having to do with LGBTQ or women's rights issues. In 1994, she directed and produced Straight From the Heart, which was nominated for an Academy Award.

Oscar nomination for Straight from the Heart

In 1995, Mosbacher co-directed and co-produced (with Frances Reid) Straight From the Heart, a documentary that explored relationships between heterosexual parents and their adult lesbian and gay children. The film was nominated for an Oscar in the Documentary (Short Subject) category.

Training Rules

In 2009, Mosbacher co-directed and co-produced with Fawn Yacker the documentary film Training Rules, an hour-long movie about Rene Portland, a women's basketball coach from Penn State University. Portland allegedly banned lesbians from playing on her team. The film contains interviews with former athletes and faculty members at Penn State who say that Portland actively pursued and harassed members of her team whom she suspected were gay.

Affiliations
From 1994 to 2002, Mosbacher served on the Pitzer College Board of Trustees. In 2011, she established the Mosbacher Fund for Media Studies and the Mosbacher/Gartrell Center for Media Experimentation and Activism at Pitzer College.

The Last Closet 
In 2012, Woman Vision launched The Last Closet, a web-based campaign and video project to end homophobia in men's professional sports.

Personal life
Mosbacher is married to Nanette Gartrell, a researcher, psychiatrist, and author.

Filmography
 1985: Closets are Health Hazards: Gay and Lesbian Physicians Come Out - Director/Producer
 1991: Lesbians on Practice, Patients, and Power  - Director/Producer
 1994: Straight From the Heart - Director/Producer (with Frances Reid and Deborah Hoffman)
 1995: Out for a Change: Addressing Homophobia in Women's Sports  - Director/Producer
 1996: All God's Children - Director/Producer (with Sylvia Rhue and Frances Reid)
 2001: De Colores  - Executive Producer
 2002: Radical Harmonies - Director/Producer (with Boden Sandstrom and June Millington)
 2006: No Secret Anymore: The Times of Del Martin and Phyllis Lyon - Producer (with Joan E. Biren)
 2009: Training Rules  - Director/Producer (with Fawn Yacker)

Awards
 1992: Creating Change Award, from the National Gay and Lesbian Task Force
 1995: Jerry E. Berg Leadership Award, from the Human Rights Campaign Fund
 1997: Liberty Award, from Lambda Legal Defense
 2009: Barbara Gittings Memorial Award, from Equality Forum
 2014: Mathew O. Tobriner Public Service Award, from the Legal Aid Society (San Francisco), Employment Law Center
In 1991, Dee Mosbacher was the first Pitzer College graduate to deliver a commencement address at her alma mater. In 2010, she established the Mosbacher/Gartrell Center for Media Experimentation and Activism at Pitzer College.

See also
 List of female film and television directors
 List of lesbian filmmakers
 List of LGBT-related films directed by women

References

Further reading

External links
 
Woman Vision - official website
Training Rules - official website
Dee Mosbacher papers and Woman Vision records at the Sophia Smith Collection, Smith College Special Collections

Living people
1949 births
American documentary filmmakers
American people of German-Jewish descent
American psychiatrists
Lesbian feminists
LGBT physicians
LGBT film directors
American LGBT rights activists
LGBT people from Texas
People from Houston
Activists from Texas
American women psychiatrists
Film directors from Texas
Pitzer College alumni
Baylor College of Medicine alumni
American women documentary filmmakers
21st-century LGBT people
21st-century American women